Juan de Valle y Arredondo (1567 – 20 February 1622) was a Roman Catholic prelate who served as Bishop of Guadalajara (1607–1617).

Biography
Juan de Valle y Arredondo was born in San Miguel del Arroyo, Spain and ordained a priest in the Order of Saint Benedict. On 19 March 1607, he was selected by the King of Spain and confirmed by Pope Paul V as Bishop of Guadalajara. In December 1607, he was consecrated bishop by Juan Bautista Acevedo Muñoz, Patriarch of the West Indies with Juan Vigil de Quiñones y Labiada, Bishop of Valladolid, and Lucas Duran, Bishop Emeritus of Chiapas as co-consecrators. In 1617, he resigned as Bishop of Guadalajara; he died on 20 February 1622.

References

External links and additional sources
 (for Chronology of Bishops)
 (for Chronology of Bishops)

1567 births
1622 deaths
17th-century Roman Catholic bishops in Mexico
Bishops appointed by Pope Paul V